The following list is a discography of productions by Mike Shinoda, an American hip hop record producer, recording artist, and the principal songwriter, keyboardist, rhythm guitarist and co-vocalist of the rock band Linkin Park from Agoura Hills, Los Angeles. It includes a list of songs produced, co-produced and remixed by year, artist, album and title.

Singles and other songs featured and produced

As vocal

As programmer

Producer

Studio albums produced

Remix albums produced

Mixtapes produced

Live albums produced

Soundtracks and score produced

Compilation albums produced

Extended plays produced

Demo albums produced

Remixes

Other works

References

Shinoda, Mike
discography, production